Zdeněk Křížek (born 16 January 1983) is a former Czech footballer, who last played for České Budějovice as a goalkeeper. He has represented his country at youth international level.

References

External links
 
 
 Profile at club website

1983 births
Living people
Czech footballers
Association football goalkeepers
Czech First League players
SK Dynamo České Budějovice players
Czech National Football League players